Roald Dahl (13 September 1916 – 23 November 1990) was a British popular author of irreverent children's literature and short stories, a poet, and wartime fighter ace. His books have sold more than 300 million copies worldwide. Dahl has been called "one of the greatest storytellers for children of the 20th century".

Dahl was born in Wales to affluent Norwegian immigrant parents, and spent most of his life in England. He served in the Royal Air Force (RAF) during the Second World War. He became a fighter pilot and, subsequently, an intelligence officer, rising to the rank of acting wing commander. He rose to prominence as a writer in the 1940s with works for children and for adults, and he became one of the world's best-selling authors. His awards for contribution to literature include the 1983 World Fantasy Award for Life Achievement and the British Book Awards' Children's Author of the Year in 1990. In 2008, The Times placed Dahl 16th on its list of "The 50 Greatest British Writers Since 1945". In 2021, Forbes ranked him the top-earning dead celebrity.

Dahl's short stories are known for their unexpected endings, and his children's books for their unsentimental, macabre, often darkly comic mood, featuring villainous adult enemies of the child characters. His children's books champion the kindhearted and feature an underlying warm sentiment. His works for children include James and the Giant Peach, Charlie and the Chocolate Factory, Matilda, The Witches, Fantastic Mr Fox, The BFG, The Twits, George's Marvellous Medicine and Danny, the Champion of the World. His works for older audiences include the short story collections Tales of the Unexpected and The Wonderful Story of Henry Sugar and Six More.

Early life

Childhood 

Roald Dahl was born in 1916 at Villa Marie, Fairwater Road, in Llandaff, Cardiff, Wales, to Norwegians Harald Dahl (1863–1920) and Sofie Magdalene Dahl (née Hesselberg) (1885–1967). Dahl's father, a wealthy shipbroker and self-made man, had emigrated to the UK from Sarpsborg in Norway and settled in Cardiff in the 1880s with his first wife, Frenchwoman Marie Beaurin-Gresser. They had two children together (Ellen Marguerite and Louis) before her death in 1907. Roald Dahl's mother belonged to a well-established Norwegian family of lawyers, priests in the state church and wealthy merchants and estate owners, and emigrated to the UK when she married his father in 1911. Dahl was named after Norwegian polar explorer Roald Amundsen. His first language was Norwegian, which he spoke at home with his parents and his sisters Astri, Alfhild, and Else. The children were raised in Norway's Lutheran state church, the Church of Norway, and were baptised at the Norwegian Church, Cardiff. His maternal grandmother Ellen Wallace was a granddaughter of the member of parliament Georg Wallace and a descendant of an early 18th-century Scottish immigrant to Norway.

Dahl's sister Astri died from appendicitis at age seven in 1920 when Dahl was three years old, and his father died of pneumonia at age 57 several weeks later. Later that year, his youngest sister, Asta, was born. Upon his death, Harald Dahl left a fortune assessed for probate of £158,917 10s. 0d. (equivalent to £ in ). Dahl's mother decided to remain in Wales instead of returning to Norway to live with relatives, as her husband had wanted their children to be educated in English schools, which he considered the world's best. When he was six years old, Dahl met his idol Beatrix Potter, author of The Tale of Peter Rabbit featuring the mischievous Peter Rabbit, the first licensed fictional character. In 2020 their meeting would be dramatised in the television drama film, Roald & Beatrix: The Tail of the Curious Mouse.

Dahl first attended The Cathedral School, Llandaff. At age eight, he and four of his friends were caned by the headmaster after putting a dead mouse in a jar of gobstoppers at the local sweet shop, which was owned by a "mean and loathsome" old woman named Mrs Pratchett. The five boys named their prank the "Great Mouse Plot of 1924". Mrs Pratchett inspired Dahl's creation of the cruel headmistress Miss Trunchbull in Matilda, and a prank, this time in a water jug belonging to Trunchbull, would also appear in the book. Gobstoppers were a favourite sweet among British schoolboys between the two World Wars, and Dahl referred to them in his fictional Everlasting Gobstopper which was featured in Charlie and the Chocolate Factory.

Dahl transferred to St Peter's boarding school in Weston-super-Mare. His parents had wanted him to be educated at an English public school, and this proved to be the nearest because of the regular ferry link across the Bristol Channel. Dahl's time at St Peter's was unpleasant; he was very homesick and wrote to his mother every week but never revealed his unhappiness to her. After her death in 1967, he learned that she had saved every one of his letters; they were broadcast in abridged form as BBC Radio 4's Book of the Week in 2016 to mark the centenary of his birth. Dahl wrote about his time at St Peter's in his autobiography Boy: Tales of Childhood.

Repton School 

From 1929, when he was 13, Dahl attended Repton School in Derbyshire. Dahl disliked the hazing and described an environment of ritual cruelty and status domination, with younger boys having to act as personal servants for older boys, frequently subject to terrible beatings. His biographer Donald Sturrock described these violent experiences in Dahl's early life. Dahl expresses some of these darker experiences in his writings, which is also marked by his hatred of cruelty and corporal punishment.

According to Dahl's autobiography, Boy: Tales of Childhood, a friend named Michael was viciously caned by headmaster Geoffrey Fisher. Writing in that same book, Dahl reflected: "All through my school life I was appalled by the fact that masters and senior boys were allowed literally to wound other boys, and sometimes quite severely... I couldn’t get over it. I never have got over it." Fisher was later appointed Archbishop of Canterbury, and he crowned Queen Elizabeth II in 1953. However, according to Dahl's biographer Jeremy Treglown, the caning took place in May 1933, a year after Fisher had left Repton; the headmaster was in fact J. T. Christie, Fisher's successor as headmaster. Dahl said the incident caused him to "have doubts about religion and even about God".

He was never seen as a particularly talented writer in his school years, with one of his English teachers writing in his school report "I have never met anybody who so persistently writes words meaning the exact opposite of what is intended." Dahl was exceptionally tall, reaching  in adult life. He played sports including cricket, football and golf, and was made captain of the squash team. As well as having a passion for literature, he developed an interest in photography and often carried a camera with him.

During his years at Repton, the Cadbury chocolate company occasionally sent boxes of new chocolates to the school to be tested by the pupils. Dahl dreamt of inventing a new chocolate bar that would win the praise of Mr Cadbury himself; this inspired him in writing his third children's book, Charlie and the Chocolate Factory (1964), and to refer to chocolate in other children's books.

Throughout his childhood and adolescent years, Dahl spent the majority of his summer holidays with his mother's family in Norway. He wrote about many happy memories from those visits in Boy: Tales of Childhood, such as when he replaced the tobacco in his half-sister's fiancé's pipe with goat droppings. He noted only one unhappy memory of his holidays in Norway: at around the age of eight, he had to have his adenoids removed by a doctor. His childhood and first job selling kerosene in Midsomer Norton and surrounding villages in Somerset are subjects in Boy: Tales of Childhood.

After school 

In July 1934, Dahl joined the Shell Petroleum Company. Following two years of training in the United Kingdom, he was assigned first to Mombasa, Kenya, then to Dar es Salaam in the British colony of Tanganyika (now part of Tanzania). Dahl explains in his autobiography "Going Solo" that only three young Englishmen ran the Shell company in the territory, of which he was the youngest and junior. Along with the only two other Shell employees in the entire territory, he lived in luxury in the Shell House outside Dar es Salaam, with a cook and personal servants. While out on assignments supplying oil to customers across Tanganyika, he encountered black mamba snakes and lions, among other wildlife.

Fighter pilot 

In August 1939, as the Second World War loomed, the British made plans to round up the hundreds of Germans living in Dar-es-Salaam. Dahl was commissioned as a lieutenant into the King's African Rifles, commanding a platoon of Askari men, indigenous troops who were serving in the colonial army.

In November 1939, Dahl joined the Royal Air Force (RAF) as an aircraftman with service number 774022. After a  car journey from Dar es Salaam to Nairobi, he was accepted for flight training with sixteen other men, of whom only three survived the war. With seven hours and 40 minutes experience in a De Havilland Tiger Moth, he flew solo; Dahl enjoyed watching the wildlife of Kenya during his flights. Following six months' training on Hawker Harts, Dahl was commissioned as a pilot officer on 24 August 1940, and was judged ready to join a squadron and face the enemy.

He was assigned to No. 80 Squadron RAF, flying obsolete Gloster Gladiators, the last biplane fighter aircraft used by the RAF. Dahl was surprised to find that he would not receive any specialised training in aerial combat or in flying Gladiators. On the final leg, he could not find the airstrip and, running low on fuel and with night approaching, he was forced to attempt a landing in the desert. The undercarriage hit a boulder and the aircraft crashed. Dahl's skull was fractured and his nose was smashed; he was temporarily blinded. He managed to drag himself away from the blazing wreckage and lost consciousness. He wrote about the crash in his first published work.

Dahl was rescued and taken to a first-aid post in Mersa Matruh, where he regained consciousness, but not his sight. He was transported by train to the Royal Navy hospital in Alexandria. There he fell in and out of love with a nurse, Mary Welland. A RAF inquiry into the crash revealed that the location to which he had been told to fly was completely wrong, and he had mistakenly been sent instead to the no man's land between the Allied and Italian forces.

In February 1941, Dahl was discharged from the hospital and deemed fully fit for flying duties. By this time, 80 Squadron had been transferred to the Greek campaign and based at Eleusina, near Athens. The squadron was now equipped with Hawker Hurricanes. Dahl flew a replacement Hurricane across the Mediterranean Sea in April 1941, after seven hours' experience flying Hurricanes. By this stage in the Greek campaign, the RAF had only 18 combat aircraft in Greece: 14 Hurricanes and four Bristol Blenheim light bombers. Dahl flew in his first aerial combat on 15 April 1941, while flying alone over the city of Chalcis. He attacked six Junkers Ju 88s that were bombing ships and shot one down. On 16 April in another air battle, he shot down another Ju 88.

On 20 April 1941, Dahl took part in the Battle of Athens, alongside the highest-scoring British Commonwealth ace of World War II, Pat Pattle, and Dahl's friend David Coke. Of 12 Hurricanes involved, five were shot down and four of their pilots killed, including Pattle. Greek observers on the ground counted 22 German aircraft downed, but because of the confusion of the aerial engagement, none of the pilots knew which aircraft they had shot down. Dahl described it as "an endless blur of enemy fighters whizzing towards me from every side".

In May, as the Germans were pressing on Athens, Dahl was evacuated to Egypt. His squadron was reassembled in Haifa. From there, Dahl flew sorties every day for a period of four weeks, shooting down a Vichy French Air Force Potez 63 on 8 June and another Ju 88 on 15 June. In a memoir, Dahl recounts in detail an attack by him and his fellow Hurricane pilots on the Vichy-held Rayak airfield. He says that as he and his fellow Hurricane pilots swept in:

. . . low over the field at midday we saw to our astonishment a bunch of girls in brightly coloured cotton dresses standing out by the planes with glasses in their hands having drinks with the French pilots, and I remember seeing bottles of wine standing on the wing of one of the planes as we went swooshing over. It was a Sunday morning and the Frenchmen were evidently entertaining their girlfriends and showing off their aircraft to them, which was a very French thing to do in the middle of a war at a front-line aerodrome. Every one of us held our fire on that first pass over the flying field and it was wonderfully comical to see the girls all dropping their wine glasses and galloping in their high heels for the door of the nearest building. We went round again, but this time we were no longer a surprise and they were ready for us with their ground defences, and I am afraid that our chivalry resulted in damage to several of our Hurricanes, including my own. But we destroyed five of their planes on the ground.

Despite this somewhat light-hearted account, Dahl also noted that, ultimately, Vichy forces killed four of the nine Hurricane pilots in his squadron.  Describing the Vichy forces as "disgusting," he stated that "...thousands of lives were lost, and I for one have never forgiven the Vichy French for the unnecessary slaughter they caused."
	
When he began to get severe headaches that caused him to black out, he was invalided home to Britain where he stayed with his mother in Buckinghamshire. Though at this time Dahl was only a pilot officer on probation, in September 1941 he was simultaneously confirmed as a pilot officer and promoted to war substantive flying officer.

Diplomat, writer and intelligence officer
After being invalided home, Dahl was posted to an RAF training camp in Uxbridge. He attempted to recover his health enough to become an instructor. In late March 1942, while in London, he met the Under-Secretary of State for Air, Major Harold Balfour, at his club. He arrived in Halifax, Canada, on 14 April, after which he took a sleeper train to Montreal.

Coming from war-starved Britain (in what was a wartime period of rationing in the United Kingdom), Dahl was amazed by the wealth of food and amenities to be had in North America. Arriving in Washington a week later, Dahl found he liked the atmosphere of the US capital. He shared a house with another attaché at 1610 34th Street, NW, in Georgetown. But after ten days in his new posting, Dahl strongly disliked it, feeling he had taken on "a most ungodly unimportant job". He later explained, "I'd just come from the war. People were getting killed. I had been flying around, seeing horrible things. Now, almost instantly, I found myself in the middle of a pre-war cocktail party in America."

Dahl was unimpressed by his office in the British Air Mission, attached to the embassy. He was also unimpressed by the ambassador, Lord Halifax, with whom he sometimes played tennis and whom he described as "a courtly English gentleman". Dahl socialised with Charles E. Marsh, a Texas publisher and oilman, at his house at 2136 R Street, NW, and the Marsh country estate in Virginia. As part of his duties as assistant air attaché, Dahl was to help neutralise the isolationist views still held by many Americans by giving pro-British speeches and discussing his war service; the United States had entered the war only the previous December, following the attack on Pearl Harbor.

At this time Dahl met the noted British novelist C. S. Forester, who was also working to aid the British war effort. Forester worked for the British Ministry of Information and was writing propaganda for the Allied cause, mainly for American consumption. The Saturday Evening Post had asked Forester to write a story based on Dahl's flying experiences; Forester asked Dahl to write down some RAF anecdotes so that he could shape them into a story. After Forester read what Dahl had given him, he decided to publish the story exactly as Dahl had written it. He originally titled the article as "A Piece of Cake" but the magazine changed it to "Shot Down Over Libya" to make it sound more dramatic, although Dahl had not been shot down; it was published on 1 August 1942 issue of the Post. Dahl was promoted to flight lieutenant (war-substantive) in August 1942. Later he worked with such other well-known British officers as Ian Fleming (who later published the popular James Bond series) and David Ogilvy, promoting Britain's interests and message in the US and combating the "America First" movement.

This work introduced Dahl to espionage and the activities of the Canadian spymaster William Stephenson, known by the codename "Intrepid". During the war, Dahl supplied intelligence from Washington to Prime Minister Winston Churchill. As Dahl later said: "My job was to try to help Winston to get on with FDR, and tell Winston what was in the old boy's mind." Dahl also supplied intelligence to Stephenson and his organisation, known as British Security Coordination, which was part of MI6. Dahl was once sent back to Britain by British Embassy officials, supposedly for misconduct—"I got booted out by the big boys," he said. Stephenson promptly sent him back to Washington—with a promotion to wing commander rank. Toward the end of the war, Dahl wrote some of the history of the secret organisation; he and Stephenson remained friends for decades after the war.

Upon the war's conclusion, Dahl held the rank of a temporary wing commander (substantive flight lieutenant). Owing to the severity of his injuries from the 1940 accident, he was pronounced unfit for further service and was invalided out of the RAF in August 1946. He left the service with the substantive rank of squadron leader. His record of five aerial victories, qualifying him as a flying ace, has been confirmed by post-war research and cross-referenced in Axis records. It is most likely that he scored more than those victories during 20 April 1941, when 22 German aircraft were shot down.

Post-war life

Dahl married American actress Patricia Neal on 2 July 1953 at Trinity Church in New York City. Their marriage lasted for 30 years and they had five children:
 Olivia Twenty (1955–1962);
 Chantal Sophia "Tessa" (born 1957), who became an author, and mother of author, cookbook writer and former model Sophie Dahl (after whom Sophie in The BFG is named);
 Theo Matthew (born 1960);
 Ophelia Magdalena (born 1964);
 Lucy Neal (born 1965).
On 5 December 1960, four-month-old Theo Dahl was severely injured when his baby carriage was struck by a taxicab in New York City. For a time, he suffered from hydrocephalus. As a result, his father became involved in the development of what became known as the "Wade-Dahl-Till" (or WDT) valve, a device to improve the shunt used to alleviate the condition. The valve was a collaboration between Dahl, hydraulic engineer Stanley Wade, and London's Great Ormond Street Hospital neurosurgeon Kenneth Till, and was used successfully on almost 3,000 children around the world.

In November 1962, Dahl's daughter Olivia died of measles encephalitis, age seven. Her death left Dahl "limp with despair", and feeling guilty about not having been able to do anything for her. Dahl subsequently became a proponent of immunisation—writing "Measles: A Dangerous Illness" in 1988 in response to measles cases in the UK—and dedicated his 1982 book The BFG to his daughter. After Olivia's death and a meeting with a Church official, Dahl came to view Christianity as a sham. In mourning he had sought spiritual guidance from Geoffrey Fisher, the former Archbishop of Canterbury, and was dismayed being told that, although Olivia was in Paradise, her beloved dog Rowley would never join her there. Dahl recalled years later: 

In 1965, Dahl's wife Patricia Neal suffered three burst cerebral aneurysms while pregnant with their fifth child, Lucy. Dahl took control of her rehabilitation over the next months; Neal had to re-learn to talk and walk, but she managed to return to her acting career. This period of their lives was dramatised in the film The Patricia Neal Story (1981), in which the couple were played by Glenda Jackson and Dirk Bogarde.

In 1972, Roald Dahl met Felicity d'Abreu Crosland, niece of Lt.-Col. Francis D'Abreu who was married to Margaret Bowes Lyon, the first cousin of the Queen Mother, while Felicity was working as a set designer on an advert for Maxim coffee with the author's then wife, Patricia Neal. Soon after the pair were introduced, they began an 11-year affair. In 1983 Neal and Dahl divorced and Dahl married Felicity, at Brixton Town Hall, South London. Felicity (known as Liccy) gave up her job and moved into Gipsy House, Great Missenden in Buckinghamshire, which had been Dahl's home since 1954.

In the 1986 New Years Honours List, Dahl was offered an appointment to Officer of the Order of the British Empire (OBE), but turned it down. He reportedly wanted a knighthood so that his wife would be Lady Dahl.

In 2012, Dahl was featured in the list of The New Elizabethans to mark the diamond Jubilee of Queen Elizabeth II. A panel of seven academics, journalists and historians named Dahl among the group of people in the UK "whose actions during the reign of Elizabeth II have had a significant impact on lives in these islands and given the age its character".

In September 2016, Dahl's daughter Lucy received the BBC's Blue Peter Gold badge in his honour, the first time it had ever been awarded posthumously.

Writing

Dahl's first published work, inspired by a meeting with C. S. Forester, was "A Piece of Cake", on 1 August 1942. The story, about his wartime adventures, was bought by The Saturday Evening Post for US$1,000 and published under the title "Shot Down Over Libya".

His first children's book was The Gremlins, published in 1943, about mischievous little creatures that were part of Royal Air Force folklore. The RAF pilots blamed the gremlins for all the problems with the aircraft. The protagonist Gus—an RAF pilot, like Dahl—joins forces with the gremlins against a common enemy, Hitler and the Nazis. While at the British Embassy in Washington, Dahl sent a copy to the First Lady Eleanor Roosevelt who read it to her grandchildren, and the book was commissioned by Walt Disney for a film that was never made. Dahl went on to write some of the best-loved children's stories of the 20th century, such as Charlie and the Chocolate Factory, Matilda, James and the Giant Peach, The Witches, Fantastic Mr Fox, The BFG, The Twits and George's Marvellous Medicine.

Dahl also had a successful parallel career as the writer of macabre adult short stories, which often blended humour and innocence with surprising plot twists. The Mystery Writers of America presented Dahl with three Edgar Awards for his work, and many were originally written for American magazines such as Collier's ("The Collector's Item" was Collier's Star Story of the week for 4 September 1948), Ladies Home Journal, Harper's, Playboy and The New Yorker. Works such as Kiss Kiss subsequently collected Dahl's stories into anthologies, and gained significant popularity. Dahl wrote more than 60 short stories; they have appeared in numerous collections, some only being published in book form after his death. His three Edgar Awards were given for: in 1954, the collection Someone Like You; in 1959, the story "The Landlady"; and in 1980, the episode of Tales of the Unexpected based on "Skin".

One of his more famous adult stories, "The Smoker", also known as "Man from the South", was filmed twice as both 1960 and 1985 episodes of Alfred Hitchcock Presents, filmed as a 1979 episode of Tales of the Unexpected, and also adapted into Quentin Tarantino's segment of the film Four Rooms (1995). This oft-anthologised classic concerns a man in Jamaica who wagers with visitors in an attempt to claim the fingers from their hands. The original 1960 version in the Hitchcock series stars Steve McQueen and Peter Lorre. Five additional Dahl stories were used in the Hitchcock series. Dahl was credited with teleplay for two episodes, and four of his episodes were directed by Alfred Hitchcock himself, an example of which was "Lamb to the Slaughter" (1958).

Dahl acquired a traditional Romanichal vardo in the 1960s, and the family used it as a playhouse for his children at home in Great Missenden, Buckinghamshire. He later used the vardo as a writing room, where he wrote Danny, the Champion of the World in 1975. Dahl incorporated a Gypsy wagon into the main plot of the book, where the young English boy, Danny, and his father, William (played by Jeremy Irons in the film adaptation) live in a vardo. Many other scenes and characters from Great Missenden are reflected in his work. For example, the village library was the inspiration for Mrs Phelps' library in Matilda, where the title character devours classic literature by the age of four.

His short story collection Tales of the Unexpected was adapted to a successful TV series of the same name, beginning with "Man from the South". When the stock of Dahl's own original stories was exhausted, the series continued by adapting stories written in Dahl's style by other authors, including John Collier and Stanley Ellin. Another collection of short stories, The Wonderful Story of Henry Sugar and Six More, was published in 1977, and the eponymous short story will be adapted into a film in 2023 by director Wes Anderson with Benedict Cumberbatch as the titular character Henry Sugar.

Some of Dahl's short stories are supposed to be extracts from the diary of his (fictional) Uncle Oswald, a rich gentleman whose sexual exploits form the subject of these stories. In his novel My Uncle Oswald, the uncle engages a temptress to seduce 20th century geniuses and royalty with a love potion secretly added to chocolate truffles made by Dahl's favourite chocolate shop, Prestat of Piccadilly, London. Memories with Food at Gipsy House, written with his wife Felicity and published posthumously in 1991, was a mixture of recipes, family reminiscences and Dahl's musings on favourite subjects such as chocolate, onions and claret.

The last book published in his lifetime, Esio Trot, released in January 1990, marked a change in style for the author. Unlike other Dahl works (which often feature tyrannical adults and heroic/magical children), it is the story of an old, lonely man trying to make a connection with a woman he has loved from afar. In 1994, the English language audiobook recording of the book was provided by Monty Python member Michael Palin. Screenwriter Richard Curtis adapted it into a 2015 BBC television comedy film, Roald Dahl's Esio Trot, featuring Dustin Hoffman and Judi Dench as the couple.

Children's fiction

Dahl's children's works are usually told from the point of view of a child. They typically involve adult villains who hate and mistreat children, and feature at least one "good" adult to counteract the villain(s). These stock characters are possibly a reference to the abuse that Dahl stated that he experienced in the boarding schools he attended. Dahl's books see the triumph of the child; children's book critic Amanda Craig said, "He was unequivocal that it is the good, young and kind who triumph over the old, greedy and the wicked." Anna Leskiewicz in The Telegraph wrote "It's often suggested that Dahl's lasting appeal is a result of his exceptional talent for wriggling his way into children’s fantasies and fears, and laying them out on the page with anarchic delight. Adult villains are drawn in terrifying detail, before they are exposed as liars and hypocrites, and brought tumbling down with retributive justice, either by a sudden magic or the superior acuity of the children they mistreat."

While his whimsical fantasy stories feature an underlying warm sentiment, they are often juxtaposed with grotesque, darkly comic and sometimes harshly violent scenarios. The Witches, George's Marvellous Medicine and Matilda are examples of this formula. The BFG follows, with the good giant (the BFG or "Big Friendly Giant") representing the "good adult" archetype and the other giants being the "bad adults". This formula is also somewhat evident in Dahl's film script for Chitty Chitty Bang Bang. Class-conscious themes also surface in works such as Fantastic Mr Fox and Danny, the Champion of the World where the unpleasant wealthy neighbours are outwitted.

Dahl also features characters who are very fat, usually children. Augustus Gloop, Bruce Bogtrotter and Bruno Jenkins are a few of these characters, although an enormous woman named Aunt Sponge features in James and the Giant Peach and the nasty farmer Boggis in Fantastic Mr Fox is an enormously fat character. All of these characters (with the possible exception of Bruce Bogtrotter) are either villains or simply unpleasant gluttons. They are usually punished for this: Augustus Gloop drinks from Willy Wonka's chocolate river, disregarding the adults who tell him not to, and falls in, getting sucked up a pipe and nearly being turned into fudge. In Matilda, Bruce Bogtrotter steals cake from the evil headmistress, Miss Trunchbull, and is forced to eat a gigantic chocolate cake in front of the school; when he unexpectedly succeeds at this, Trunchbull smashes the empty plate over his head. In The Witches, Bruno Jenkins is lured by the witches (whose leader is the Grand High Witch) into their convention with the promise of chocolate, before they turn him into a mouse. Aunt Sponge is flattened by a giant peach. When Dahl was a boy his mother used to tell him and his sisters tales about trolls and other mythical Norwegian creatures, and some of his children's books contain references or elements inspired by these stories, such as the giants in The BFG, the fox family in Fantastic Mr Fox and the trolls in The Minpins.

Receiving the 1983 World Fantasy Award for Life Achievement, Dahl encouraged his children and his readers to let their imagination run free. His daughter Lucy stated "his spirit was so large and so big he taught us to believe in magic." She said her father later told her that if they had simply said goodnight after a bedtime story, he assumed it wasn't a good idea. But if they begged him to continue, he knew he was on to something, and the story would sometimes turn into a book.

Dahl was also famous for his inventive, playful use of language, which was a key element to his writing. He invented new words by scribbling down his words before swapping letters around and adopting spoonerisms and malapropisms. The lexicographer Susan Rennie stated that Dahl built his new words on familiar sounds, adding:

A UK television special titled Roald Dahl's Revolting Rule Book which was hosted by Richard E. Grant and aired on 22 September 2007, commemorated Dahl's 90th birthday and also celebrated his impact as a children's author in popular culture. It also featured eight main rules he applied on all his children's books:
 Just add chocolate
 Adults can be scary
 Bad things happen
 Revenge is sweet
 Keep a wicked sense of humour
 Pick perfect pictures
 Films are fun...but books are better!
 Food is fun!

In 2016, marking the centenary of Dahl's birth, Rennie compiled The Oxford Roald Dahl Dictionary which includes many of his invented words and their meaning. Rennie commented that some of Dahl's words have already escaped his world, for example, Scrumdiddlyumptious: "Food that is utterly delicious". In his poetry, Dahl gives a humorous re-interpretation of well-known nursery rhymes and fairy tales, parodying the narratives and providing surprise endings in place of the traditional happily-ever-after. Dahl's collection of poems Revolting Rhymes is recorded in audiobook form, and narrated by actor Alan Cumming.

Screenplays
For a brief period in the 1960s, Dahl wrote screenplays. Two, the James Bond film You Only Live Twice and Chitty Chitty Bang Bang, were adaptations of novels by Ian Fleming. Dahl also began adapting his own novel Charlie and the Chocolate Factory, which was completed and rewritten by David Seltzer after Dahl failed to meet deadlines, and produced as the film Willy Wonka & the Chocolate Factory (1971). Dahl later disowned the film, saying he was "disappointed" because "he thought it placed too much emphasis on Willy Wonka and not enough on Charlie". He was also "infuriated" by the deviations in the plot devised by David Seltzer in his draft of the screenplay. This resulted in his refusal for any more versions of the book to be made in his lifetime, as well as an adaptation for the sequel Charlie and the Great Glass Elevator.

Influences

A major part of Dahl's literary influences stemmed from his childhood. In his younger days, he was an avid reader, especially awed by fantastic tales of heroism and triumph. He met his idol, Beatrix Potter, when he was six years old. His other favourite authors included Rudyard Kipling, Charles Dickens, William Makepeace Thackeray and Frederick Marryat, and their works made a lasting mark on his life and writing. Joe Sommerlad in The Independent writes, "Dahl’s novels are often dark affairs, filled with cruelty, bereavement and Dickensian adults prone to gluttony and sadism. The author clearly felt compelled to warn his young readers about the evils of the world, taking the lesson from earlier fairy tales that they could stand hard truths and would be the stronger for hearing them."

Dahl was also influenced by Lewis Carroll’s Alice's Adventures in Wonderland. The "Drink Me" episode in Alice inspired a scene in Dahl's George's Marvellous Medicine where a tyrannical grandmother drinks a potion and is blown up to the size of a farmhouse. Finding too many distractions in his house, Dahl remembered the poet Dylan Thomas had found a peaceful shed to write in close to home. Dahl travelled to visit Thomas's hut in Carmarthenshire, Wales in the 1950s and, after taking a look inside, decided to make a replica of it to write in.

Dahl liked ghost stories, and claimed that Trolls by Jonas Lie was one of the finest ghost stories ever written. While he was still a youngster, his mother, Sofie Dahl, related traditional Norwegian myths and legends from her native homeland to Dahl and his sisters. Dahl always maintained that his mother and her stories had a strong influence on his writing. In one interview, he mentioned: "She was a great teller of tales. Her memory was prodigious and nothing that ever happened to her in her life was forgotten." When Dahl started writing and publishing his famous books for children, he included a grandmother character in The Witches, and later said that she was based directly on his own mother as a tribute.

Television
In 1961, Dahl hosted and wrote for a science fiction and horror television anthology series called Way Out, which preceded the Twilight Zone series on the CBS network for 14 episodes from March to July. One of the last dramatic network shows shot in New York City, the entire series is available for viewing at The Paley Center for Media in New York City and Los Angeles. He also wrote for the satirical BBC comedy programme That Was the Week That Was, which was hosted by David Frost.

The British television series, Tales of the Unexpected, originally aired on ITV between 1979 and 1988. The series was released to tie in with Dahl's short story anthology of the same name, which had introduced readers to many motifs that were common in his writing. The series was an anthology of different tales, initially based on Dahl's short stories. The stories were sometimes sinister, sometimes wryly comedic and usually had a twist ending. Dahl introduced on camera all the episodes of the first two series, which bore the full title Roald Dahl's Tales of the Unexpected.

Death and legacy

Roald Dahl died on 23 November 1990, at the age of 74 of a rare cancer of the blood, myelodysplastic syndrome, in Oxford, and was buried in the cemetery at the Church of St Peter and St Paul, Great Missenden, Buckinghamshire, England. According to his granddaughter, the family gave him a "sort of Viking funeral". He was buried with his snooker cues, some very good burgundy, chocolates, HB pencils and a power saw. Today, children continue to leave toys and flowers by his grave.

In November 1996, the Roald Dahl Children's Gallery was opened at the Buckinghamshire County Museum in nearby Aylesbury. The main-belt asteroid 6223 Dahl, discovered by Czech astronomer Antonín Mrkos, was named in his memory in 1996.

In 2002, one of Cardiff Bay's modern landmarks, the Oval Basin plaza, was renamed Roald Dahl Plass. Plass is Norwegian for "place" or "square", alluding to the writer's Norwegian roots. There have also been calls from the public for a permanent statue of him to be erected in Cardiff. In 2016, the city celebrated the centenary of Dahl's birth in Llandaff. Welsh Arts organisations, including National Theatre Wales, Wales Millennium Centre and Literature Wales, came together for a series of events, titled Roald Dahl 100, including a Cardiff-wide City of the Unexpected, which marked his legacy.

Dahl's charitable commitments in the fields of neurology, haematology and literacy during his life have been continued by his widow since his death, through Roald Dahl's Marvellous Children's Charity, formerly known as the Roald Dahl Foundation. The charity provides care and support to seriously ill children and young people throughout the UK. In June 2005, the Roald Dahl Museum and Story Centre in the author's home village Great Missenden was officially opened by Cherie Blair, wife of UK Prime Minister Tony Blair, to celebrate the work of Roald Dahl and advance his work in literacy education. Over 50,000 visitors from abroad, mainly from Australia, Japan, the United States and Germany, travel to the village museum every year.

In 2008, the UK charity Booktrust and Children's Laureate Michael Rosen inaugurated The Roald Dahl Funny Prize, an annual award to authors of humorous children's fiction. On 14 September 2009 (the day after what would have been Dahl's 93rd birthday) the first blue plaque in his honour was unveiled in Llandaff. Rather than commemorating his place of birth, however, the plaque was erected on the wall of the former sweet shop (and site of "The Great Mouse Plot of 1924") that features in the first part of his autobiography Boy. It was unveiled by his widow Felicity and son Theo. In 2018, Weston-super-Mare, the town described by Dahl as a "seedy seaside resort", unveiled a blue plaque dedicated to him, on the site of the since-demolished boarding school Dahl attended, St Peter's. The anniversary of Dahl's birthday on 13 September is celebrated as "Roald Dahl Day" in Africa, the United Kingdom and Latin America.

In honour of Dahl, the Royal Gibraltar Post Office issued a set of four stamps in 2010 featuring Quentin Blake's original illustrations for four of the children's books written by Dahl during his long career; The BFG, The Twits, Charlie and the Chocolate Factory, and Matilda. A set of six commemorative Royal Mail stamps was issued in 2012, featuring Blake's illustrations for Charlie and the Chocolate Factory, The Witches, The Twits, Matilda, Fantastic Mr Fox, and James and the Giant Peach. Dahl's influence has extended beyond literary figures. For instance film director Tim Burton recalled from childhood "the second layer [after Dr. Seuss] of connecting to a writer who gets the idea of the modern fable—and the mixture of light and darkness, and not speaking down to kids, and the kind of politically incorrect humour that kids get. I've always like that, and it's shaped everything I've felt that I've done." Steven Spielberg read The BFG to his children when they were young, stating the book celebrates the fact that it's OK to be different as well as to have an active imagination: "It's very important that we preserve the tradition of allowing young children to run free with their imaginations and magic and imagination are the same thing." Actress Scarlett Johansson named Fantastic Mr Fox one of the five books that made a difference to her.

Regarded as "one of the greatest storytellers for children of the 20th century", Dahl was named by The Times one of the 50 greatest British writers since 1945. He ranks amongst the world's best-selling fiction authors with sales estimated at over 300 million, and his books have been published in 63 languages. In 2000 Dahl topped the list of Britain's favourite authors. In 2003 four books by Dahl, led by Charlie and the Chocolate Factory at number 35, ranked among the Top 100 in The Big Read, a survey of the British public by the BBC to determine the "nation's best-loved novel" of all time. In surveys of UK teachers, parents and students, Dahl is frequently ranked the best children's writer. In a 2006 list for the Royal Society of Literature, Harry Potter creator J. K. Rowling named Charlie and the Chocolate Factory one of her top ten books every child should read. Critics have commented on the similarities between the Dursley family from Harry Potter and the nightmarish guardians seen in many of Dahl's books, such as Aunt Sponge and Aunt Spiker from James and the Giant Peach, Grandma from George's Marvellous Medicine, and the Wormwoods from Matilda. In 2012, Matilda was ranked number 30 among all-time best children's novels in a survey published by School Library Journal, a monthly with primarily US audience. The Top 100 included four books by Dahl, more than any other writer. The American magazine Time named three Dahl books in its list of the 100 Best Young-Adult Books of All Time, more than any other author. Dahl is one of the most borrowed authors in UK libraries.

In 2012, Dahl was among the British cultural icons selected by artist Peter Blake to appear in a new version of his most famous artwork—the Beatles' Sgt. Pepper's Lonely Hearts Club Band album cover—to celebrate the British cultural figures of his life he most admires. In 2016 Dahl's enduring popularity was proved by his ranking in Amazon's the top five best-selling children's authors on the online store over the last year, looking at sales in print and on the Kindle store. In a 2017 UK poll of the greatest authors, songwriters, artists and photographers, Dahl was named the greatest storyteller of all time, ranking ahead of Dickens, Shakespeare, Rowling and Spielberg. In 2017, the airline Norwegian announced Dahl's image would appear on the tail fin one of their Boeing 737-800 aircraft. He is one of the company's six "British tail fin heroes", joining Queen frontman Freddie Mercury, England World Cup winner Bobby Moore, novelist Jane Austen, pioneering pilot Amy Johnson and aviation entrepreneur Freddie Laker.

In September 2021, Netflix acquired the Roald Dahl Story Company in a deal worth more than £500 million ($686 million). A film adaptation of Matilda the Musical was released by Netflix and Sony Pictures Releasing in December 2022, and the cast includes Emma Thompson as Miss Trunchbull.

Criticism and controversy

Anti-Semitic and Anti-Israel Comments
Dahl reviewed Australian author Tony Clifton's God Cried, a picture book about the siege of West Beirut by the Israeli army during the 1982 Lebanon War. The article appeared in the August 1983 issue of the Literary Review and was the subject of much media comment and criticism at the time. According to Dahl, until this point in time "a race of people", meaning Jews, had never "switched so rapidly from victims to barbarous murderers." The empathy of all after the Holocaust had turned "into hatred and revulsion." Dahl wrote that Clifton's book would make readers "violently anti-Israeli", with Dahl stating: "I am not anti-Semitic. I am anti-Israel." He asked: "must Israel, like Germany, be brought to her knees before she learns how to behave in this world?" The United States, he said, was "so utterly dominated by the great Jewish financial institutions" that "they dare not defy" Israelis.

Following the Literary Review article, Dahl told a journalist from the New Statesman: "There's a trait in the Jewish character that does provoke animosity, maybe it's a kind of lack of generosity towards non-Jews. I mean there is always a reason why anti-anything crops up anywhere; even a stinker like Hitler didn't just pick on them for no reason." In 1990, during an interview with The Independent, Dahl explained that his issue with Israel began when they invaded Lebanon in 1982: "they killed 22,000 civilians when they bombed Beirut. It was very much hushed up in the newspapers because they are primarily Jewish-owned. I'm certainly anti-Israeli and I've become antisemitic in as much as that you get a Jewish person in another country like England strongly supporting Zionism. I think they should see both sides. It's the same old thing: we all know about Jews and the rest of it. There aren't any non-Jewish publishers anywhere, they control the media—jolly clever thing to do—that's why the president of the United States has to sell all this stuff to Israel." Responding in 1990 to a journalist from The Jewish Chronicle, whom he considered rude, he said: "I am an old hand at dealing with you buggers."

Jeremy Treglown, in his 1994 biography, writes of Dahl's first novel Sometime Never (1948): "plentiful revelations about Nazi anti-Semitism and the Holocaust did not discourage him from satirising 'a little pawnbroker in Hounsditch called Meatbein who, when the wailing started, would rush downstairs to the large safe in which he kept his money, open it and wriggle inside on to the lowest shelf where he lay like a hibernating hedgehog until the all-clear had gone. In a short story entitled "Madame Rosette", the eponymous character is termed "a filthy old Syrian Jewess".

Dahl had Jewish friends, including the philosopher Isaiah Berlin, who commented: "I thought he might say anything. Could have been pro-Arab or pro-Jew. There was no consistent line. He was a man who followed whims, which meant he would blow up in one direction, so to speak." Amelia Foster, director of the Roald Dahl Museum in Great Missenden, says: "This is again an example of how Dahl refused to take anything seriously, even himself. He was very angry at the Israelis. He had a childish reaction to what was going on in Israel. Dahl wanted to provoke, as he always provoked at dinner. His publisher was a Jew, his agent was a Jew... and he thought nothing but good things of them. He asked me to be his managing director, and I'm Jewish."

In 2014, the Royal Mint decided not to produce a coin to commemorate the centenary of Dahl's birth, saying that it considered him to be "associated with antisemitism and not regarded as an author of the highest reputation". In 2020, Dahl's family published a statement on the official Roald Dahl website apologising for his antisemitism. The statement says "The Dahl family and the Roald Dahl Story Company deeply apologise for the lasting and understandable hurt caused by some of Roald Dahl’s statements. Those prejudiced remarks are incomprehensible to us and stand in marked contrast to the man we knew and to the values at the heart of Roald Dahl's stories, which have positively impacted young people for generations. We hope that, just as he did at his best, at his absolute worst, Roald Dahl can help remind us of the lasting impact of words." The apology was received with appreciation by Jewish groups but some organisations, such as the Campaign Against Antisemitism, said that: "For his family and estate to have waited thirty years to make an apology, apparently until lucrative deals were signed with Hollywood, is disappointing and sadly rather more comprehensible."

Use of racial and sexist stereotypes 
In 1972, Eleanor Cameron, also a children's book author, published an article in The Horn Book criticising Charlie and the Chocolate Factory for being self-referentially hypocritical:  Cameron took issue with the depiction of the Oompa-Loompas as imported African slaves and suggested that teachers look for better literature to use in the classroom. In 1973, Dahl posted a reply, calling Cameron's accusations "insensitive" and "monstrous". The Horn Book published Cameron's response, where she clarified that she intended her article not to be a personal attack on Dahl, but to point out that though the book is a work of fiction, it still influences reality. She again objected to the Oompa-Loompa depiction: "[T]he situation of the Oompa-Loompas is real; it could not be more so, and it is anything but funny." The debate between the two authors sparked much discussion and a number of letters to the editor.

A 1991 article by Michael Dirda published in The Washington Post, echoed Cameron's comments, writing "the Oompa-Loompas... reveal virtually every stereotype about blacks". Dirda's article also discussed many of the other criticisms of Dahl's writing, including his alleged misogyny. He wrote "The Witches verges on a general misogyny" and Michele Landsberg's 1998 article analysing the alleged issues in Dahl's work also stated: "Throughout his work, evil, domineering, smelly, fat, ugly women are his favorite villains."

In 2008, Una Malley wrote an article that described Dahl's short story collection Switch Bitch as "a collection better forgotten, laden with crude and often disturbing sexual fantasy writing". Nonetheless, Malley argued that there are feminist messages in Dahl's work, even if they may be obscured: "The Witches offers up plenty of feminist complexities. The witches themselves are terrifying and vile things, and always women... The book is often viewed as sexist, but that assessment ignores one of the heroines of the story, the child narrator's grandmother."

2023 revisions

In 2023, Puffin Books, which holds the rights to all Dahl's children's books, ignited controversy after they hired sensitivity readers to go through the original text of Dahl's works, which led to hundreds of revisions to his books; The Telegraph published a list of many of these changes. The move was supported by a number of authors, most notably by Joanne Harris, chair of the Society of Authors, but drew many more critical responses. Several public figures, including Rishi Sunak, Salman Rushdie, and Camilla, Queen Consort all spoke out against the changes. It was reported that when Dahl was alive, he had spoken out very strongly against any changes ever being made to any of his books. On 23 February 2023, Puffin announced it would release an unedited selection of Dahl's children's books as 'The Roald Dahl Classic Collection', stating "We've listened to the debate over the past week which has reaffirmed the extraordinary power of Roald Dahl's books" and "recognise the importance of keeping Dahl's classic texts in print."

Filmography

Writing roles

Presenting roles

Non-presenting appearances

Publications

Notes

References

Sources

Further reading

 Jason Hook, Roald Dahl: The Storyteller, Raintree, 2004

External links

 
 Roald Dahl's darkest hour (biography excerpt)
 
 
 
 Radio interview by NRK (1975) 
 "The Devious Bachelor", Sunday Book Review of The Irregulars, Roald Dahl and the British Spy Ring in Wartime Washington by Jennet Conant, The New York Times, 17 October 2008
 Profile of Patricia Neal (2011) on Voice of America (VOAnews.com), with transcript
 Footage of one Whitbread Book Prize presentation by Dahl (1982)

 
1916 births
1990 deaths
20th-century British novelists
20th-century British poets
20th-century British short story writers
Absurdist fiction
Anti-Zionism in the United Kingdom
Audiobook narrators
British children's writers
British fantasy writers
British horror writers
British male writers
British parodists
British people of Norwegian descent
British science fiction writers
British short story writers
British social commentators
British World War II flying aces
Burials in Buckinghamshire
Children's poets
Deaths from cancer in England
Deaths from myelodysplastic syndrome
Edgar Award winners
Former Lutherans
King's African Rifles officers
Military personnel from Cardiff
People educated at Repton School
People educated at The Cathedral School, Llandaff
People from Georgetown (Washington, D.C.)
People from Llandaff
Royal Air Force pilots of World War II
Royal Air Force squadron leaders
Vaccination advocates
Welsh people of Norwegian descent
Welsh people of Scottish descent
World War II spies for the United Kingdom
Writers from Cardiff